Latham is a hamlet (and census-designated place) in Albany County, New York, United States. It is located along U.S. Route 9 in the town of Colonie, a dense suburb north of Albany. As of the 2010 census, the population was 20,736. Latham was a census-designated place in the 1970, 1980, and 1990 US Censuses, but ceased to be in the 2000 Census, then became a CDP again in 2020.

History

The area was known at different times in its history as Yearsley's (c. 1829), Van Vranken's (c. 1851), Town House Corners (c. 1860) and Latham's Corners, named after hotel owner William G. Latham. The "corner" referred to is now the intersection of Troy-Schenectady Road (NY Route 2) and Old Loudon Road.

Before European expansion to North America, Latham was occupied by Mohicans. The Old Loudon Road was built in 1755 during the French and Indian War to bring troops and provisions from Albany to the areas of Lake George and Ticonderoga.  The Troy and Schenectady Turnpike was built in 1802 and intersected Old Loudon. An early first resident of this hamlet was Jonas Yearsley, 1785, who later built the first hotel close to this intersection. The hamlet was known first under the name of Yearsley's Corners and years afterward as Van Vrankens Corners in the 1850s. The name changed into Latham when William Latham became owner of the hotel. James, his son, continued to run the hotel until he died on August 14, 1933.

Geography
The hamlet itself is very narrow east–west and relatively long north–south, centered on the intersection of the Troy-Schenectady Road and Old Loudon Road. As a hamlet, its boundaries are not clearly defined, though they are marked by the New York State Department of Transportation on the western and eastern ends on New York Route 2 and on the southern end on U.S. Route 9 (US 9). On the western end, the hamlet begins near the entrance to the former Latham Circle Mall; on the southern end it starts near the Y-intersection of US 9 and Old Loudon Road; and on the eastern end, the border is near the Kiwanis Park. The northern border is the Crescent Bridge crossing the Mohawk River into Halfmoon in Saratoga County. Blue Creek circles the area known as Pirate's Island. The area normally referred to as "Latham" extends well beyond the hamlet itself, as the name is also used for the post office of the 12110 ZIP Code. Many locations often considered in the northern and northeastern parts of Latham are in the Cohoes ZIP Code, while many in the eastern sections use a Watervliet ZIP Code.

Latham's terrain is mostly a hilly mix of deciduous and evergreen trees, with some ponds, creeks and swamps, including several protected water courses and New York State Wetlands. Streams east of Old Loudon Road and US 9 generally drain into the Hudson River; west of Old Loudon and US 9, the hamlet's watercourses drain into the Mohawk River.

Notable people
 Jeff Hoffman, pitcher for the Cincinnati Reds
 Tommy Kahnle, pitcher for the Los Angeles Dodgers
 Sam Perkins, played for four teams during a 17-year career in the National Basketball Association 
 Jeff Spraker, NASCAR driver and crew chief
 David Wu, American politician
 Ron Vawter, actor

See also 
 Reformed Dutch Church (1817)

References

External links

 "Latham Circle Mall" at Dead Malls
 Town of Colonie (includes Latham)
 North Colonie Public Schools
 Hidden in Suburbia (Photo Essay)
 Latham Water Tower Replacement Plan (from Albany Airport)
 Latham Fire Department

Colonie, New York
Former census-designated places in New York (state)
Hamlets in Albany County, New York
Hamlets in New York (state)